Malta competed at the 1980 Summer Olympics in Moscow, USSR. Eight competitors, seven men and one woman, took part in five events in three sports.

Archery

In its first archery competition at the Olympics, Malta entered one man and one woman.  They finished last and second-to-last in their divisions, respectively.

Women's:
 Joanna Agius - 2119 points (28th place)

Men's:

Cycling

Four cyclists represented Malta in 1980.

Individual road race
 Joseph Farrugia
 Carmel Muscat
 Alfred Tonna
 Albert Micallef

Team time trial
 Joseph Farrugia
 Albert Micallef
 Carmel Muscat
 Alfred Tonna

Shooting

See also
 Malta at the 1980 Summer Paralympics

References

External links
Official Olympic Reports

Nations at the 1980 Summer Olympics
1980 Summer Olympics
Summer Olympics